Mohammed Saleh Al Qahtani served as a board member of the Boy Scouts of Bahrain, as well as a member of the Arab Scout Committee.

In 1994, he was awarded the 235th Bronze Wolf, the only distinction of the World Organization of the Scout Movement, awarded by the World Scout Committee for exceptional services to world Scouting.

References

External links

Recipients of the Bronze Wolf Award
Year of birth missing
Scouting and Guiding in Bahrain